Nakhon Phanom is a town in northeastern Thailand. Nakhon Phanom may also refer to:

Nakhon Phanom Province
Mueang Nakhon Phanom district
Nakhon Phanom Airport
Nakhon Phanom Royal Thai Air Force Base
Nakhon Phanom University